Church Street School may refer to:

 Church Street School (Thomasville, North Carolina), listed on the NRHP in North Carolina
 Church Street School (Nutley, New Jersey), listed on the NRHP in New Jersey
 Church Street School swimming pool in Glasgow, Scotland